William d'Aubigny may refer to: 

 William d'Aubigny (died 1139), Pincerna Regis (Chief Butler of England)
 William d'Aubigny (Brito) (died c. 1148), itinerant justice under King Henry I of England
 William d'Aubigny (rebel) (died 1216), Magna Carta surety
 William d'Aubigny, 1st Earl of Arundel and Pincerna Regis (c. 1109–1176)
 William d'Aubigny, 2nd Earl of Arundel (c. 1150–1193)
 William d'Aubigny, 3rd Earl of Arundel (c. 1167–1221)
 William d'Aubigny, 4th Earl of Arundel (before 7 August 1224)